Covelli may refer to:

Covelli Centre,  arena in Youngstown, Ohio, United States

People
Covelli Crisp (Coco Crisp; born 1979), American professional baseball player
Frankie Covelli (1913–2003), American boxer
Alfredo Covelli (1914–1998), Italian politician
Emilio Covelli (1846–1915), Italian anarchist

See also
 Covel (disambiguation)
 Covell, a surname
 Covellite (or covelline), a copper sulfide mineral
 Sparganothina covelli, a species of moth